Cathy's Valentine is a 1989 animated television special based on the Cathy comic strip by Cathy Guisewite. It features Kathleen Wilhoite as the voice of Cathy Andrews, and was written by Guisewite, executive-produced by Lee Mendelson, produced by Bill Melendez, and directed by Evert Brown. This special premiered after This Is America, Charlie Brown: The Building of the Transcontinental Railroad.

Plot
As Valentine's Day approaches, Cathy, ever the romantic, becomes passionately consumed with thoughts of hearts, flowers and candle-lit dinners. On the other hand, her boyfriend Irving seeks to maintain his independence. They begin to ponder the nature of their relationship while stumbling into further misadventures and whimsical misunderstandings.

Voices
 Kathleen Wilhoite as Cathy Andrews
 Robert F. Paulsen as Irving Hillman
 Shirley Mitchell as Anne - Cathy's Mom
 Jerry Houser as Ross
 Allison Argo as Andrea
 William L. Guisewite as Bill - Cathy's Dad
 Gregg Berger as Mr. Pinkley
 Emily Levine as Charlene
 Susan Silo as Janet
 Loren Dunsworth as Lisa
 Sheryl Bernstein as Joyce
 Jamie E. Smith as Zenith
 Jeremy Frey as Additional Voices

References

External links
 
 

1980s American television specials
1989 television specials
1989 in American television
1980s animated television specials
CBS television specials
Hollywood, Los Angeles in fiction
Television shows based on comic strips
Television shows directed by Bill Melendez
Valentine's Day television specials